Hang Up My Spurs is the 17th studio album by American country band Asleep at the Wheel. Recorded during 2001 at Bismeaux Studio in Austin, Texas, it was produced by the band's frontman Ray Benson and released in January 2002 as one of the first albums on Cracker Barrel Old Country Stores' own label CB Music. Several songs on the album had been previously recorded by the band for earlier releases, while others are new compositions produced exclusively for the release.

Background
In 2002, American restaurant chain Cracker Barrel Old Country Stores founded its own record label called CB Music, with the first 16 releases coming under the Heritage Music Collection banner. One of the releases was an exclusive new studio album by Asleep at the Wheel, Hang Up My Spurs. Commenting on the partnership, CB Music manager Julie Davis stated that "We thought it would be good to share Asleep At The Wheel with our customers. They've been playing western swing longer than Bob Wills did, and they are truly wonderful." Ray Benson claimed that "When asked to do the project, we jumped [at the chance]!"

Track listing

Personnel
Asleep at the Wheel
Ray Benson – lead and backing vocals, acoustic and electric guitars, production
Jim Murphy – steel guitar
David Miller – bass, backing vocals
John Michael Whitby – piano, backing vocals
David Sanger – drums
Jason Roberts – fiddle, electric guitar, backing and lead vocals
Additional personnel
Cindy Cashdollar – steel guitar 
Floyd Domino – piano 
Chris Burns – engineering

References

External links

Asleep at the Wheel albums
2002 albums